Aleksey Viktorovich Markovsky (born 17 May 1957) is a retired Russian swimmer who won a silver medal in the 4 × 100 m medley relay at the 1980 Summer Olympics; he finished eighth in the 100 m butterfly event at the same Olympics. After the games, between 1981 and 1986 (aged 24–29) he won ten medals at the World and European Championships, mostly in relay events. He missed the 1984 Summer Olympics that were boycotted by the Soviet Union, and took part in the Friendship Games instead.

He graduated from the Ural State University of Physical Culture in Chelyabinsk. After retiring from swimming, between 1988 and 1992 he was the head coach of the junior Soviet swimming team.

References

People from Kurgan, Kurgan Oblast
1957 births
Living people
Russian male swimmers
Russian male freestyle swimmers
Male butterfly swimmers
Olympic swimmers of the Soviet Union
Swimmers at the 1980 Summer Olympics
World Aquatics Championships medalists in swimming
European Aquatics Championships medalists in swimming
Medalists at the 1980 Summer Olympics
Olympic silver medalists for the Soviet Union
Universiade medalists in swimming
Universiade gold medalists for the Soviet Union
Universiade silver medalists for the Soviet Union
Medalists at the 1981 Summer Universiade
Medalists at the 1983 Summer Universiade
Soviet male freestyle swimmers
Sportspeople from Kurgan Oblast